Khilgaon is a Thana of Dhaka District in the Division of Dhaka, Bangladesh. It is bounded by Rampura and Badda Thana on the north, Motijheel, Sabujbagh and Demra Thanas on the south, Rupganj Upazila on the east and Ramna thana on the west.

Geography
Its total area is 14.02 km2.

Demographics
Khilgaon has a population of 230,902. Males constitute 54.3% of the population, and females 45.7%. Average literacy rate of the thana is 57.5%; male being 61.52% and female 53.74%.

Transportation
Rickshaws, CNGs are always available. There are also some buses available which includes Midline, Bahon, Turag, Noor-E-Mekkah, Raida, Labbaik, Talukdar etc. These buses link between Khilgaon, Farmgate, Nilkhet, Motijheel, Dhanmondi, Mohammadpur, Badda, Gulshan, Mirpur, Moghbazar and many other places.

Flyover Bridge
Khilgaon Flyover is the second flyover constructed in Bangladesh. Image of Khilgaon Flyover: https://www.google.com/search?q=khilgaon+flyover&sxsrf=ALeKk028D16cWS0G9huVR2_FaC-qUjyd6Q:1614746749288&source=lnms&tbm=isch&sa=X&ved=2ahUKEwjlupKzqJPvAhXP73MBHXcrAx8Q_AUoAXoECAIQAw&biw=1229&bih=578#imgrc=3YNsMf7q-jq0YM

Education

There are 26 schools, 6 Madashas and 11 colleges in the upazila. Khilgaon Model College is the only masters level one. Here are some notable schools and colleges:

Khilgaon Government High School

National Ideal College

Khilgaon Government Girls' School and College

Quality Education School, Khilgaon

Khilgaon Model School

Faizur Rahman Ideal Institute

Dhaka Ideal School

Bashabo High School

Ali Ahmed High School

Shantipur High School and College

Dakhin Banasree Model High School & College

See also
 Upazilas of Bangladesh
 Districts of Bangladesh
 Divisions of Bangladesh

References

Thanas of Dhaka